The Minardi PS04B was a Formula One race car used by Minardi Cosworth in the 2004 Formula One season.

Background 
In 2003 all of the Arrows A23 chassis and the full Arrows Grand Prix International intellectual property rights were bought by Minardi. The Arrows A23 was renamed the Minardi PS04 and in back-to-back tests it was found superior to the Minardi's PS03. Minardi however decided that they could not run a "pure-Arrows" and hence used the Arrows intellectual property, which included the new designs for a proposed Arrows A24 and the best elements from the PS03 and the Arrows A23/PS04 to develop the Minardi PS04B for the 2004 season.

Period reports even hinted that the PS04B was possibly based more closely on the Arrows A24 than Minardi might have been prepared to publicly admit.

Racing history 
The PS04B was driven by rookie Gianmaria Bruni, and Zsolt Baumgartner who had moved from Jordan. The team managed to earn their first point in two years, after Baumgartner finished 8th (albeit last) at the United States Grand Prix.

For 2005, Minardi used a PS04B chassis for the first three races of the season before they made a new PS05 chassis due to assembly problems. The engine name changed from CR-3L to CK2004, but it was basically the same engine.

Sponsorship and livery 
The team's black and white livery saw the addition of Superfund's deep green to the engine covers. 

During the British Grand Prix, the team ran with no sponsors, replacing them with the words "John Boy" in honor to Sporting Director John Walton, who died from a heart attack.

Complete Formula One results
(key) (results in bold indicate pole position) 

* All points scored with the PS05.

References

External links
Minardi PS04B Technical Specs

Minardi Formula One cars